Shir Mahalleh (also Romanized as Shīr Maḩalleh) is a village in Emamzadeh Abdollah Rural District, Dehferi District, Fereydunkenar County, Mazandaran Province, Iran. At the 2006 census, its population was 2,024, in 557 families.

References 

Populated places in Fereydunkenar County